Intermarché (English translation: Intermarket) is the brand of a general commercial French supermarket, part of the large retail group Les Mousquetaires founded in 1969 under the name EX Offices, by Jean-Pierre Le Roch. EX Offices was renamed Intermarché in 1972.

Jean-Pierre Le Roch is the founder and first president of this franchise, and has provided leadership until 1994, then directly through Les Mousquetaires made necessary by the creation of other brands.

History
Founded in 1969 under the name of EX Offices de distribution, the chain became Intermarché in 1973.

On 9 June 2009, Les Mousquetaires announced the extension of the Intermarché brand to all their grocery subsidiaries, except Netto. Now Intermarché decline is based on the sales floor, as well as its location.

The old food stores owned by Les Mousquetaires under several brands, as well as the existing Intermarché stores have been divided into several groups:

 Intermarché Hyper for the largest stores between 3,200 m2 and 6,000 m2
 Intermarché Super around 2,000 m2, for most Intermarché stores
 Intermarché Express convenience stores installed in city centers  
 Intermarché Contact convenience stores in rural areas which mostly replace Écomarché stores.

On 8 October 2014 ITM Intermarché and the Casino Group announced an agreement to rally their purchases together toward suppliers in France. This alliance makes these two groups the first retail purchaser in the country with a market share of 25.8%.

International expansion
Les Mousquetaires has Intermarché stores in Belgium, Lebanon (under the name of "metro"), Egypt and Portugal since 1991, in Poland since 1997 and in Serbia as well as Bosnia and Herzegovina and Romania since 1999.

However, Intermarché left the Romanian market in 2012 because of poor sales. It was known as Interex (ro) in Romania.

In December 2014, all 24 Interex stores in Bosnia and Herzegovina were sold to Bingo. Also, it left Serbian market a year later, in 2015. Serbian Interex stores were sold to Aman.

Own brands
Intermarché offers a range of its own brands : 
 Chabrior (flour-based food baked such as bread, cookies, cakes, pastries)
 Paquito (fruit-based products like juices, stewed fruits...)
 Monique Ranou / Claude Léger (catering-food)
 Pâturages (dairy products)
 Saint Eloi (tinned food)
 Look (non alcoholic drinks)
 Apta (cleaning products)
 Elodie (sugar-based food such as marmalades and candies)

Écomarché
The Écomarché chain of supermarkets was created in 1969 and developed in 1986. At one point there were 330 rural stores in France. They were similar to Intermarché, but mostly on a smaller scale than most supermarkets in France with a sales area between 400 and 1800 m2. The target of the Écomarché chain was to compensate for the lack of local shops and to focus upon customer care, attention to the product, quality, choice and the environment.

From 2009, the Écomarché chain became two brands of the Intermarché, either Intermarché Contact if smaller than 1,500 square meters or Intermarché Super if bigger. The other Écomarché stores in urban areas became Intermarché Express or Intermarché Super (if larger than 1,500 sq. meters).

Écomarché stores could be found in Belgium, Portugal and France, which all became Intermarché Contact or Express.

Competitors
 Carrefour Market (supermarket) (part of the Carrefour Group)
 Super U (part of 'Système U' Group)
 Shopi (part of the Carrefour Group)
 Auchan Supermarché (groupe Auchan)
 Casino Supermarché
 E.Leclerc
 Carrefour Group

References

External links

 Intermarché's English Website

Supermarkets of France
Retail companies established in 1969
French companies established in 1969

pt:Intermarché